Leshan Normal University (LSNU) is a teacher's college in Shizhong District, Leshan, Sichuan, China.

It was formerly known in English as Leshan Teacher's College (LSTC).

References

External links
 Leshan Normal University 
 International student page in English

 
Universities and colleges in Sichuan
Teachers colleges in China
Buildings and structures in Leshan